Big East Coach of the Year may refer to:
Big East Football Coach of the Year
Big East Men's Basketball Coach of the Year